The Way We Live Now is a 1970 film directed by Barry Brown and based on Warren Miller's novel.

Plot
An advertisement executive has a problem trying to leave the family and make an affair.

Cast
Nicholas Pryor - Lionel Aldridge
Joanna Miles - Amelia
Lois Smith - Jane Aldridge
Sydney Walker - Lincoln
Linda Blair - Sara Aldridge
Samantha Jones - Samantha

See also
 List of American films of 1970

External links

1970 films
1970 drama films
Films set in New York City
United Artists films
American drama films
1970s English-language films
1970s American films